Auratonota chemillena is a species of moth of the family Tortricidae. It is found in Peru.

The wingspan is about 20.5 mm. The ground colour of the forewings is cream with ferruginous suffusions. The markings are rust brown, darkest postmedially. The hindwings are cream, mixed with pale ferruginous apically.

Etymology
The specific name is derived from the type locality.

References

Moths described in 2010
Auratonota
Moths of South America